Giulio Bruni (died 1615) was an Italian painter of the late-Renaissance period.
 
Born in the Piedmontese, he trained mainly in Genoa, first under Lazzaro Tavarone, then under Giovanni Battista Paggi, and 
remained painting in Genoa, until he was expelled by war. He painted a St. Thomas of Villanova giving alms for the church of San Giacomo. He had a brother, Giovanni Batista, also a painter.

References

1615 deaths
17th-century Italian painters
Italian male painters
Painters from Genoa
Italian Mannerist painters
Year of birth unknown